William Poindexter Thomasson (October 8, 1797 – December 29, 1882) was a U.S. Representative from Kentucky.

Early life
William Poindexter Thommasson was born on October 8, 1797, in New Castle, Kentucky. Thomasson completed preparatory studies. He served in Captain Duncan's company in the War of 1812.

Thomasson studied law. He was admitted to the bar and commenced practice in Corydon, Indiana, before he was twenty-one years of age.

Career
Thomasson served as member of the Indiana House of Representatives in 1818–1820. He served as prosecuting attorney of Corydon in 1818. He moved to Louisville, Kentucky, in 1841. After moving to Louisville, he became city attorney and county attorney.

Thomasson was elected as a Whig to the Twenty-eighth and Twenty-ninth Congresses (March 4, 1843 – March 3, 1847). He declined to be a candidate for renomination. He moved to Chicago, Illinois, and resumed the practice of law.

During the Civil War, Thomasson served in the Union Army in the Seventy-first Regiment, New York Volunteer Infantry.

Personal life
Thomasson married Charlotte Leonard of Floyd County, Indiana in 1825. They had four children: Nelson, John J., Saran and Laura.

Thomasson died near La Grange, Kentucky on December 29, 1882. He was interred in Cave Hill Cemetery in Louisville, Kentucky.

References

1797 births
1882 deaths
People from New Castle, Kentucky
Indiana lawyers
Union Army soldiers
Burials at Cave Hill Cemetery
American military personnel of the War of 1812
Whig Party members of the United States House of Representatives from Kentucky
19th-century American politicians
People from Corydon, Indiana